Yukiwo may refer to:

Yukiwo - Japanese artist
Yukiwo P. Dengokl - Palauan senator